Cape Hollman is a headland in the north-central of the island of New Britain, Papua New Guinea, at .

Hollman